Frederico Rodrigues de Assunção Morais (born 3 January 1992), also known as Kikas, is a Portuguese professional surfer who competes on the World Surfing League Men's Championship Tour since 2017. He qualified to represent Portugal at the 2020 Summer Olympics in the men's shortboard event, but did not compete.

Career

Victories

WSL World Championship Tour

Nominations and awards

References

External links

Portuguese surfers
1992 births
Living people
Sportspeople from Cascais
World Surf League surfers